Dorasaani is a 2019 Indian Telugu-language romantic drama film directed by KVR Mahendra and starring debutants Anand Devarakonda and Shivatmika Rajashekar.

Plot 

Shankaranna, a naxalite, gets released from jail after 30 years of false imprisonment. He goes to a village and enquires about Raju. However, no one seems to know him. Shankar explores around his now changed village. Then, a man meets him, claiming to know Raju. He introduces himself as Siddadu, the ex-henchman of the dora, Raja Reddy, and also recognizes Shankaranna. The story flashes back to the 1980s, 30 years ago.

Raju is the son of a painter, from a lower caste, in rural Telangana. Devaki, is the daughter or dorasaani of the dora, Raja Reddy. Imprisoned in her own bungalow, Devaki wishes to be free and openly interact with the people in the village. Since she is motherless, her father and the domestic maid, dasi, take utmost care of her. Raju sees Devaki in a festival and falls in love with her. He starts seeing her through her window, from outside the bungalow. Raju eventually takes a disguised Devaki and explores the village, careful as to not alerting her father and his henchmen.

Devaki is spellbound by his honest and innocent nature. The Dora's henchman notice and follow them. When Raju drops off Devaki at the bungalow, the henchman beat him up with a warning, of leaving the village, but do not tell the Dora. When Raju is about to leave the village, as per his father's orders, he gets stuck in the village due to the 48 hours curfew arranged by Shankar and his naxalites. Raja Reddy eventually learns about Devaki and Raju's relationship. He makes Devaki leave for his elder son's house, under a false pretense. He makes sure that Raju is arrested. Upon learning this through a villager, Devaki escapes from her brother's house. In the meantime, Raju meets Shankar in prison and Raja Reddy frames Raju as a naxalite. As a result, their encounter is arranged. Shankar helps Raju escape from the jail.

Upon reaching Devaki, they both decide on eloping from the village. They then head to Devaki's brother. Devaki's brother surprisingly accepts their relationship. He also promises them of driving them to Hyderabad. The next day, Devaki's brother drives them to the local police station, first, to lodge a complaint, on their behalf. However, he decides against it, stating that the proceedings will take a long time. He drives the car and stops it in the middle of nowhere. He shoots both Raju and Devaki, to death, and burns the car with them inside. At present, Shankaranna is devastated upon hearing about what happened to Raju and Devaki. Siddadu tells Shankaranna that Raju won, at the moment Devaki fell for him, and when they both sacrificed each other, for their love.

Cast 
 Anand Devarakonda as Raju
 Shivatmika Rajashekar as Devaki Reddy, the dorasaani
Vinay Varma as Raja Reddy, the dora
 Sharanya Pradeep as the domestic maid or dasi
 Byreddy Vamsi Krishna Reddy as Prathap Reddy
 Kishore as Shankaranna, the naxal leader
 Surabhi Prabhavati as Raju's mother
 N. Dasharatha Reddy as Raju's father
 Anurag Parvathaneni as Siddadu, dora's henchman
 Shravan Kotha as Abdulla, Raju's friend

Release and reception 
The film released on 12 July 2019.

The Times of India gave the film three and a half out of five stars and praised the performances of the cast, the cinematographer, and the music director. The Deccan Chronicle gave the film three out of five stars and also praised the cast and crew. The Hindu praised the film, but criticized the lack of development of the plot and sub-plots. Similar to The Hindu review, The New Indian Express stated the film lacked an "engaging love story".

Music 
The songs were composed by Prashanth R Vihari and the soundtrack was produced under the label Madhura Audio.
"Ningilona Paalapuntha" - Anurag Kulkarni
"Kallallo Kala Varamai" - Chinmayi
"Kappathalli"  - Anurag Kulkarni
"Aadi Pade" - Lokeshwar

References

External links 

2019 romantic drama films
Indian romantic drama films
2019 films
Films set in 1980